Ossip Iliych Runitsch (born Osip Fradkin, 18896 April 1947) was a Russian Empire silent film actor, producer and stage director.

He was one of the biggest stars of Russian silent cinema and one of the first iconic figures of Russian cinematograph. In 1915-1919 he starred in some successful silent films of that time as Molchi, grust... molchi and Posledneiye tango with other film stars such as Vera Kholodnaya, Vitold Polonsky and Pyotr Chardynin.

Runitsch was a long time admirer of his co-star Kholodnaya and after her death in 1919 during Russian Civil War, he fled Russia and left for Italy where he took part in a number of films. Later, he moved to Germany where he starred together with Emil Jannings and other famous German actors.

In 1925 he married Nina Pavlishcheva, a courtier ballet dancer.

By the late 1930s, he was living in Riga, Latvia, where he played in the troupe of Russian Drama Theatre. Apparently, when he realised that the World War II was inevitable, he accepted an invitation to tour South Africa from his local Jewish friends. He stayed in South Africa and became a founder of one of the first professional theatre companies in a country. He also produced operas for the State Theatre in the mid 1940s.

Filmography

 Война и Мир (Voyna i mir) (1915) as Nikolai Rostov
 Песнь торжествующей любви (Pesn torzhestvuyushchey lyubvi) (1915)
 Обожженные крылья (Obozhzhenniye krylya) (1915)
 Истерзанные души (Isterzannye dushi) (1917) as Ingenieur Karin
 Человек-зверь (Chelovek - zver) (1917)
 Живой труп (Zhivoy trup) (1918)
 Женщина,которая изобрела любовь (Zhenshchina, kotoraya izobrela lyubov) (1918)
 Молчи, грусть... молчи... (Molchi, grust... molchi) (1918) as Zaritskii, a barrister
 Последнее танго (Posledneiye tango) (1918) as Joe
 Die Bestie im Menschen (1920) as Jacques Lantier
 L'orchidea fatale (1920)
 Lord Bluff (1920)
 La catena (1920)
 L'automobile errante (1921)
 Danton (1921) as Desmoulins
 Playing with Fire (1921)
 Dubrowsky, der Räuber Ataman (1921)
 The Infernal Power (1922)
 Marie Antoinette - Das Leben einer Königin (1922)
 Psicha, die Tänzerin Katherina (1923)
 The Doll Maker of Kiang-Ning (1923)
 Düstere Schatten, strahlendes Glück (1924) as F. C. Morland
 Frühlingsfluten (1924)
 Prater (1924) as Graf Rynon
 The Golden Calf (1925) as Leibgardist
Diary of a Coquette (1929) as Hoteldirektor Lambert
 Sensation im Wintergarten (1929) as Zirkusdirektor
 Das Donkosakenlied (1930) as Basmanoff

See also
Aleksandr Khanzhonkov
Vera Kholodnaya
Vitold Polonsky
Igor Ilyinsky
Emil Jannings

References

External links

Им восторгались двинчанки (in Russian)

1889 births
1947 deaths
Male actors from the Russian Empire
Russian male silent film actors
South African people of Russian-Jewish descent
White Russian emigrants to Germany
White Russian emigrants to Italy